Sibbu Suryan (Born: 26 March 1990), is an Indian television actor who predominantly works in Tamil and Kannada industry. He is best known for playing the lead role Arjun Prathap in Tamil soap opera Roja.

Career 
Sibbu was born on 26 March 1990 in Shimoga, Karnataka to a Hindu Rajput family. He is a graduate from the National Institute of Technology, Karnataka.

He made his television debut through Kannada serial Radha Ramana  which aired from 2017 to 2019. He became popular through his role of Arjun Prathap in Tamil serial Roja.

He is currently filming for a Kannada film Shakuntala by composer-director Hamsalekha in which he plays a grey shaded character. He is also working in a Tamil film in which he plays a politician.

Filmography

Television

Special appearances

Awards

References 

1990 births
Living people
Indian television actors
Male actors in Kannada television
Actors in Tamil cinema
People from Shimoga
Tamil television actors
Tamil male television actors
National Institute of Technology, Karnataka alumni